Elections were held in the Australian state of Victoria on Saturday 31 May 1958 to elect the 66 members of the state's Legislative Assembly. This was the last time Assembly elections were held separately from those for the Legislative Council.

The Liberal and Country Party (LCP) government of Premier Henry Bolte won a second term in office.

Results

Legislative Assembly

|}

Seats changing party representation

There was a redistribution across Victoria prior to this election. The seat changes are as follows.

Abolished seats

New seats

Seats changing hands

See also
Candidates of the 1958 Victorian state election
1958 Victorian Legislative Council election

References

1958 elections in Australia
Elections in Victoria (Australia)
1950s in Victoria (Australia)
May 1958 events in Australia